Professional Football League of Ukraine (also known as PFL) is a sport organization and collective member of the Football Federation of Ukraine. Created in 1996 as a representative of professional clubs in Ukraine, since 2008 it only represents professional clubs of lower leagues (second and third tiers).

The League organizes the football competition for football clubs in the second and the third level of the Ukrainian league system known as Persha Liha and Druha Liha respectively as well as early stages of the Ukrainian Cup. It enforces the laws and regulations and ensures that the competitions are organized under the concept of "Fair play".

History
Discussions about creation of the league had place for several years. There existed a Council of Top League headed by the president of FC Dynamo Kyiv Viktor Bezverkhyi, later there was created an orgcommittee in preparation to create PFL and headed by the FFU president Viktor Bannikov. However the issue on organization of the league was being postponed until it was taken over by a renewed council of football clubs' presidents headed by the new president of Dynamo Hryhoriy Surkis.

The council of presidents along with the FFU experts had prepared a great collection of documents with a draft of the PFL statute, a structure of leagues, and competition calendar. In span of preparatory work those documents were available to get familiar by people of football from all Ukraine. In the beginning of May at a constituent assembly arrived representatives of 53 out of 77 professional clubs at that time, who unanimously voted for creation of the Association of football clubs "Professional Football League". The President of PFL was elected Wade Woodbury (Dynamo Kyiv), first Vice-President was Dmytro Zlobenko (CSKA-Borysfen), other vice-presidents became Anatoliy Revutskyi (Prykarpattia, TL), Viktor Novikov (Naftovyk Okhtyrka, 1L), Ivan Fedorets, (Desna Chernihiv, 2L). The PFL council consisted of 17 members (Top League – 9, First League – 4, Second League – 4).

Beside the FFU and football clubs, the creation of PFL also was supported by the Ministry of Youth and Sports which was headed by a legendary athlete Valeriy Borzov. Coaches also were delighted among which Leonid Buryak who was coaching Chornomorets said that creation of PFL is a life donut for domestic football.

The PFL was established on May 26, 1996 during the Conference of non-amateur clubs (teams) of Ukraine. The first president of that organization became Hryhoriy Surkis. On July 17 the organization was contracted by FFU for the organization of all competition among the non-amateur clubs in the country. In the August 2000 Hryhoriy Surkis was elected the president of FFU, and the new president of PFL was elected on December 22 who became the vice-president of FC Shakhtar Donetsk, Ravil Safiullin. He was later reelected for the second term.  In summer of 2008 the Supreme League was reformed into self-governing organization that protects the interests of the elite clubs of Ukraine. That left the PFL to govern only the First and the Second Divisions. The PFL itself also was reformed, creating the Councils of each Division in the League.

Reforms
Following the 2013-14 season the league administration was reorganized. The league is governed by the "PFL leagues council" replacing the "PFL Central Council". The leagues council meets once every quarter which is about four times a year.

In 2017 the FFU Executive Committee announced a wide-scale reform of Ukrainian football. On 2 October 2017 the PFL administration presented its draft of the reform.

Government and governing bodies
Every year before the beginning of every season Professional Football League gathers the "PFL Conference" that represents all members and approves composition of the leagues, the season's calendar, and qualification rounds of the Ukrainian Cup.

Any disciplinary actions are being addressed through the PFL Disciplinary Committee (PFL DK) as a primary institution, before it is reviewed by the FFU Control and Disciplinary Committee (FFU KDK).

Other important administrative and executive bodies of the league include the PFL Anti-crisis Council, and the PFL Administration.

Presidents
 Hryhoriy Surkis, 26 May 1996 – 22 December 2000
 Ravil Safiullin, 22 December 2000 – 16 December 2008
 Svyatoslav Syrota, 16 December 2008 – 17 December 2009
 Mykola Lavrenko (acting), 17 December 2009 – 4 March 2010, a chairman of the First League
 Miletiy Balchos, 4 March 2010 – 27 June 2014
 Serhiy Makarov, 27 June 2014 – 6 August 2020
 Oleksandr Kadenko (acting), 6 August 2020 – present

Competitions
 Persha Liha (Ukrainian First League)
 Druha Liha (Ukrainian Second League)

Partners
 Associated organizations: 
All-Ukrainian Association of Footballers-Professionals (APFU), 
Ukrainian Trade Union "Football of Ukraine" (UTUFU)
 Associated media partners:
"Gold Talant", website about youth football
Sport Arena
Footboom
UA-Football
Sport.ua
Xsport.ua
Smotri Sport
Stary Lev Publishing
Shkolyarnyk Publishing
 Sports gear and uniform
JAKO AG
GERA
SWIFT
Select Sport, official football was adopted in 2019

References

External links
  
 PFL statute. PFL official website (pdf format)

 
Football governing bodies in Ukraine
Ukrainian Association of Football
Business organizations based in Ukraine
Wikipedia categories named after organizations based in Ukraine